Fugue (/fjuːɡ/ fewg) is an American literary magazine based out of the University of Idaho, located in Moscow, Idaho. The journal was founded in 1990 under the editorship of J. C. Hendee.

Publishing biannually, it curates works of fiction, essays, poetry, plays, interviews, and visual-text hybrids. This includes a physical copy (summer-fall) and a digital issue (winter-spring).

In addition to publishing works by established authors, Fugue also accepts work from up-and-coming writers. The journal hosts the Palouse Literary Festival and hosts an annual competition in both poetry and prose.

Notably, in 2018, Fugue published four rediscovered poems and an essay by Anne Sexton, written between 1958 and 1959, originally published in The Christian Science Monitor.

Notable contributors
Kathy Acker
Jacob M. Appel
Samuel R. Delany
Stephen Dobyns
Stephen Dunn
Raymond Federman
Brenda Hillman
W.S. Merwin
Sharon Olds
James Reiss
Pattiann Rogers
Virgil Suarez
Robert Wrigley
Charles Baxter

Honors and awards
 Fred Bahnson's essay "Climbing the Sphinx" (issue #30) was reprinted in Best American Spiritual Writing 2007.
 Cary Holladay's story "The Burning" (issue #28)  was reprinted in New Stories from the South.
 Floyd Skloot's essay "A Stable State" (issue #29) was selected as a "Notable Essay" in Best American Essays 2005.
 Becky Hagenston's story "Vines" (issue #26) received Special Mention in Pushcart Prize: Best of the Small Presses XXIX.

See also
List of literary magazines

References

External links
 Fugue Homepage
 Fugue Literary Journal Digital Collection—part of the University of Idaho Library Digital Initiatives

1990 establishments in Idaho
Literary magazines published in the United States
Biannual magazines published in the United States
Magazines established in 1990
Magazines published in Idaho
University of Idaho